Narcisa may refer to:
 Narcisa (beetle), a genus in the tribe Gymnochilini

 people
Narcisa de Jesús (1832–1869), Roman Catholic saint from Nobol, Ecuador
Narcisa de Leon (1877–1966), Filipino film producer
Narcisa Freixas (1859–1926), Catalan sculptor, painter and composer
Narcisa Lecușanu (born 1979), retired Romanian handball player
Narcisa Pérez Reoyo (1849–1876), Spanish writer